Pennsylvania Route 945 was a short connector in Smithfield Township and Middle Smithfield Township, Pennsylvania. Route 945 started at Pennsylvania Route 402 in Smithfield Township and ended at U.S. Route 209 in Middle Smithfield Township. The  route consisted entirely in Monroe County. The road was assigned in 1928, paved in 1932,  and removed in 1946. The route is now Monroe County Quadrant Route 2023.

Route description 

Route 945 began at an intersection with Pennsylvania Route 402 in Minisink Hills.
The route headed eastward, intersecting with Pennsylvania Route 612 at Shawnee-on-Delaware. The two routes were concurrent and headed to the northeast, parallelling the Delaware River. Route 945 soon turned off to the north, heading into Middle Smithfield Township. Route 945 passed to the east of Shawnee Lake, crossed through mountains and intersected with local roads. Route 945 terminated at U.S. Route 209 soon after.

History 
Route 945 was assigned, like most routes in Pennsylvania in 1928. The entire  of the highway was paved in 1931 and remained intact for the next 15 years, when it was decommissioned in 1946. What was once Route 945 is now Hollow Road and River Road (Monroe County Quadrant Route 2023).

Although Route 945 was decommissioned in favor for a couple quadrant routes, the highway has grown into a connector road for the several lakes it passed, along with the Delaware River. The southern terminus of the highway, Route 402 was truncated to the village of Marshalls Creek and is currently a local road. The northern terminus (US 209 in Coolbaughs) however, remains in place to this date.

Major intersections

See also

References

External links

PA Highways - Pennsylvania Route 612

945
Transportation in Monroe County, Pennsylvania